Kinlock is an unincorporated community located in Sunflower County, Mississippi, near the Sunflower County/Washington County border.

References

Unincorporated communities in Sunflower County, Mississippi
Unincorporated communities in Mississippi